Han Snel (1925–1998) was a Dutch painter born in Scheveningen, near the Hague, The Netherlands. He moved as a conscript to Indonesia in 1946 as part of the Dutch fight to keep control over their former colony. After the independence of Indonesia, he applied for political asylum and started to paint on the island of Bali. Snel converted to Hinduism and became a citizen of Indonesia.

References

1925 births
1998 deaths
Converts to Hinduism
Dutch former Christians
Indonesian former Christians
Dutch Hindus
Indonesian Hindus
20th-century Indonesian painters
Artists from The Hague
Dutch emigrants to Indonesia
Naturalised citizens of Indonesia